The Australia national cricket team toured New Zealand from February to April 2000 and played a three-match Test series against the New Zealand national cricket team. Australia won the Test series 3–0. New Zealand were captained by Stephen Fleming and Australia by Steve Waugh. In addition, the teams played a six-match series of Limited Overs Internationals (LOI) which Australia won 4–1.

One Day Internationals (ODIs)

Australia won the Bank of New Zealand Series 4-1, with one no-result.

1st ODI

2nd ODI

3rd ODI

4th ODI

5th ODI

6th ODI

Test series summary

1st Test

2nd Test

3rd Test

References

External links

2000 in Australian cricket
2000 in New Zealand cricket
2000
International cricket competitions from 1997–98 to 2000
New Zealand cricket seasons from 1970–71 to 1999–2000